John M. Frame (born April 8, 1939) is a retired American Christian philosopher and Calvinist theologian especially noted for his work in epistemology and presuppositional apologetics, systematic theology, and ethics. He is one of the foremost interpreters and critics of the thought of Cornelius Van Til.

Biography
Frame was born in Pittsburgh, Pennsylvania and became a Christian at the age of 13 through the ministry of Beverly Heights Presbyterian Church, a congregation of the United Presbyterian Church of North America in Pittsburgh. He graduated from Princeton University, where he was involved in the Princeton Evangelical Fellowship (PEF) and Westerly Road Church. The PEF and Westerly Road had a profound impact on forming Frame's faith and theology. He says of their impact:

I owe much to PEF ... Fullerton and PEF cared deeply about people, spending hours in mutual prayer, exhortation, counseling, gospel witness. I never experienced that depth of fellowship in any Reformed church or institution ... So I am not much impressed by people who want to set up an adversary relation between "Reformed" and "evangelical." Today, Reformed writers often disparage evangelical ministries as circuses, as clubs that will do anything at all to gain members, who pander to the basest lusts of modern culture. That was not true of PEF, or of Westerly Road Church ... PEF would never have imagined the effect their ministry had on me: they turned me into a Reformed ecumenist!

Frame received degrees from Princeton University (A.B.), Westminster Theological Seminary (BD), Yale University (AM, and M.Phil. and began work on a doctoral dissertation). He received an honorary doctorate of divinity in 2003 from Belhaven College. He is an ordained minister in the Presbyterian Church in America.

Relations to other scholars: polemics and critical reviews 

Frame is known for his critical view of historical modes of theology, including his criticism of such scholars as David F. Wells, Donald Bloesch, Mark Noll, George Marsden, D.G. Hart, Richard Muller, and Michael Horton.  Particularly notable amongst Frame's critical analyses is "Machen's Warrior Children", originally published in Alister E. McGrath and Evangelical Theology: a Dynamic Engagement (Paternoster Press, 2003).  More recently, Frame reviewed Horton's book Christless Christianity with a similar analysis.  In 1998, he debated then librarian D.G. Hart in a student-organized discussion of the regulative principle of worship.

Multiperspectival epistemology

Frame has elaborated a Christian epistemology in his 1987 work The Doctrine of the Knowledge of God. In this work, he develops what he calls triperspectivalism or multiperspectivalism which says that in every act of knowing, the knower is in constant contact with three things (or "perspectives") – the knowing subject himself, the object of knowledge, and the standard or criteria by which knowledge is attained. He argues that each perspective is interrelated to the others in such a fashion that, in knowing one of these, one actually knows the other two, also. His student and collaborator Vern Poythress has further developed this idea with respect to science and theology.  Reformed theologian Meredith Kline wrote a critique of this view, explaining that Poythress and Frame had used multiperspectivalism in ways that had led to what he considered incorrect conclusions in regards to the relation of Kline's position and Greg L. Bahnsen's on covenant theology (more specifically theonomy).

Presuppositions
As a former student of Van Til, Frame is supporter of the presuppositionalist school of Christian apologetics. He defines a presupposition as follows:

Rationalism and irrationalism in non-Christian thought
Frame, developing the thought of his mentor Cornelius Van Til, has asserted in both his Apologetics to the Glory of God and his Cornelius Van Til: An Analysis of His Thought, that all non-Christian thought can be categorized as the ebb and flow of rationalism and irrationalism.

Rationalism
In this context Frame defines rationalism as any attempt to establish the finite human mind as the ultimate standard of truth and falsity. This establishing of the autonomous intellect occurs within the context of rejecting God's revelation of himself in both nature and the Bible; a rationalist, in this sense, states that the human mind is able to fully and exhaustively explain reality.

Yet, when Frame speaks of "exhaustive explanations" he does not mean these systems seek omniscience; rather, he means that the history of non-Christian thought (though, admittedly, his focus is Western philosophy) is the history of various attempts to construct systems that account for everything (a distinctive metaphysic, epistemology and value theory).

According to Frame, examples of attempts to explain reality are found in Plato and Aristotle's form/matter dualism; the debate between the nominalists and the realists over the status of universals and particulars, and the "all is ... [fire, water, atoms,etc]" of the pre-Socratics. More examples would include Descartes' mind/body dualism, Spinoza's God or nature, and Leibniz's monadology, Plotinus' "The One" and his teaching on emanation, the British empiricists' attempts to limit knowledge and possibility to that which can be empirically verified, Kant's worlds of the noumena and the phenomena, and Hegel's dialectic.

Frame has stated that intelligent design is both "as scientific, and just as religious" as neo-Darwinism.

Irrationalism

Non-Christian thought, in Frame's view, also is characterized by irrationalism because inevitably the finite and fallen human mind cannot fully capture all of reality into a man-made system. On this position, at the point in which the non-Christian rationalist realizes that they cannot account for everything, they engage in what Francis Schaeffer called an "upper story leap."

As a brief example, Frame uses the epistemology of Kant, who taught that the categories of thought that are necessary for our understanding the world around us, such as causality, logic, time, space, and order, are structured by our minds and imposed upon the things we experience. In order to be rational and make sense out of life we must assume, or presuppose, these notions. Because we cannot empirically verify these categories by touch, smell, sight, etc. they must be thought of as created by and arising from our minds, thus ordering and providing the criterion for those things that we can empirically verify. This led Kant to conclude that if we are to think of anything at all we must think in terms of everything being caused by something logically and temporally prior to it. This led to a fairly deterministic view of mankind.

Frame asks where we can find moral responsibility and freedom in Kant's scheme. He argues that Kant believed that while we couldn't prove that man was a responsible moral agent we must nevertheless act as though this were the case. Philosophers have described these as Kant's "two worlds" – the world of nature (which leads to determinism), and the world of freedom (where responsibility is found). Kant himself spoke of the "starry skies above" and the "moral law within", and although Kant did not deny the regularity of the natural world and the reality of humanity's "moral motions," his philosophy could not bring these two worlds together. Frame concludes that Kant made the "upper story leap" to irrationalism by asserting the truth of something with no rational justification. Thus, in Immanuel Kant, Frame finds both rationalism and irrationalism.

Likewise, according to both Frame and Van Til, every non-Christian system contains what Jacques Derrida calls "alterity", that is each system contains the very principles for its downfall. They all "auto-deconstruct."

Worship and music

Frame has written two books on worship and music. These have provoked controversy as Frame interprets the regulative principle of worship (which he subscribes to) in a non-conventional manner. Frame regards contemporary worship music, musical instruments and liturgical dance as permissible, which has brought him into conflict with some Reformed theologians who regard them as forbidden in worship.

Awards and recognition

Belhaven College awarded Frame an honorary Doctor of Divinity in 2003.

Personal life
Frame married Mary Grace Cummings in 1984, and has two sons, Justin M. Frame and John A. Frame. He also has three stepchildren: Deborah, Doreen, and "Skip". As of 2017, he lived in Orlando, Florida.

Frame is a classically trained musician.

Selected works
 Introduction to Presuppositional Apologetics Part 1 & 2
 Van Til: The Theologian, 1976 
 Medical Ethics, 1988 
 Perspectives on the Word of God: An Introduction to Christian Ethics, 1990 
 Evangelical Reunion, 1991 
 Apologetics to the Glory of God, 1994 
 Cornelius Van Til: An Analysis of his Thought, 1995 
 Worship in Spirit and Truth, 1996 
 Contemporary Worship Music: A Biblical Defense, 1997 
 No Other God: A Response to Open Theism, 2001 
 Salvation Belongs To The Lord: An Introduction To Systematic Theology, 2006 
 Systematic Theology: An Introduction to Christian Belief, 2013 
 A History of Western Philosophy and Theology, 2015 
 Theology of My Life: A Theological and Apologetic Memoir, 2017

Theology of Lordship series
 The Doctrine of the Knowledge of God, 1987 
 The Doctrine of God, 2002 
 The Doctrine of the Christian Life, 2008 
 The Doctrine of the Word of God, 2010

References

External links
 Frame-Poythress.org, a current web source of the writings of Frame and Vern Poythress.
 Frame's article on "Remembering Donald B. Fullerton".

1939 births
Living people
American Presbyterians
Presbyterian Church in America ministers
Calvinist and Reformed philosophers
American Calvinist and Reformed theologians
Christian apologists
Writers from Orlando, Florida
Westminster Theological Seminary alumni
Westminster Theological Seminary faculty
Christian ethicists
Princeton University alumni
Yale Divinity School alumni
Writers from Pittsburgh
20th-century American writers
21st-century American non-fiction writers
20th-century Calvinist and Reformed theologians
21st-century Calvinist and Reformed theologians
20th-century American philosophers
21st-century American philosophers
Westminster Seminary California faculty
Critics of atheism